The Indian Two naye paise (singular: Paisa), is a unit of currency equaling  of the Indian rupee. The symbol for paisa is p.

History
Prior to 1957, Indian rupee was not decimalised and the rupee from 1835 to 1957 AD was further divided into 16 annas. Each anna was further divided to four Indian pices and each pice into three Indian pies till 1947 when the pie was demonetized. In 1955, India amended the "Indian Coinage Act" to adopt the metric system for coinage. Paisa coins were introduced in 1957, but from 1957 to 1964 the coin was called "Naya Paisa" (English: New Paisa). On 1 June 1964, the term "Naya" was dropped and the denomination was simply called "One paisa". Paisa coins were issued as a part of "The Decimal Series".

Mintage
Two naye paise coins was minted from 1957 to 1963 at the India Government mint in Bombay (present day Mumbai) and borne symbol ⧫ (small dot/diamond) as mint mark. The coin has been demonetized.

Total mintage
Total 1,826,326,000 coins were minted from 1957 to 1964.

Composition
Two naye paise coins were minted from Cupronickel alloy in medallic orientation. Scalloped with eight notches, the coins had smooth edge.

Variants

See also
 Indian paisa

References

Historical currencies of India
Coins of India